The Golden Horse Award for Best Action Choreography is given at the Golden Horse Film Awards, a film festival and awards ceremony held annually in Taiwan. The award has been given every year since 1992.

Winners and nominees 

Note: Original titles are in traditional Chinese.

1990s

2000s

2010s

2020s

References

External links 
 Official website 
 Official website 

Golden Horse Film Awards